Malika Khakimova (born 24 January 1996) is an Uzbekistani épée fencer. She competed in the 2020 Summer Olympics.  Khakimova is of Tatar descent.

References

1996 births
Living people
Uzbekistani female épée fencers
Olympic fencers of Uzbekistan
Fencers at the 2020 Summer Olympics
Tatar sportspeople
Uzbekistani people of Tatar descent
Sportspeople from Tashkent
People from Navoiy Region
21st-century Uzbekistani women